Trinity Road Police Station is the headquarters of the "Trinity Sector", or just "Trinity", of the Avon and Somerset Constabulary in Old Market area of Lawrence Hill, Bristol.

It was formed out of two previous sectors: Ashley Sector (St Pauls, Montpelier, Kingsdown, Cotham & Eastville) and Lawrence Hill/Easton Sector (Lawrence Hill, Easton, St Phillips, Redfield, Whitehall, Barton Hill, St Judes, Eastville & Redcliffe).

It was announced in April 2014 that the station is to be closed. In 2019 Avon and Somerset Constabulary stated they only needed 10% of its space, and intend to sell the building in 2019, but do not intend to leave the site entirely.

Areas covered by Trinity

Barton Hill
Easton
Eastville
Parts of Kingsdown
Lawrence Hill
Montpelier
Redcliffe
Redfield
St Judes
St Pauls
St Phillips
Whitehall

See also
Law enforcement in the United Kingdom
List of law enforcement agencies in the United Kingdom
Trinity Centre
Trinity Road Library

References

External links
Avon and Somerset Constabulary web site
Crime statistics for the Trinity Sector
Avon and Somerset Constabulary: Trinity Road Police Station
Avon and Somerset Constabulary: Trinity Sector

Buildings and structures in Bristol
Police stations in England